The Black Hand (full title The Black Hand: True Story of a Recent Occurrence in the Italian Quarter of New York) is an American silent film directed by Wallace McCutcheon. It is generally considered by motion-picture historians to be the earliest surviving gangster film.

Plot summary
In New York City, two Italian-American criminals blackmail a butcher, demanding a ransom of $1,000, otherwise, they will kidnap his daughter and blow up his shop. Unable to afford the sum, the gang kidnaps his daughter. The butcher calls the police who finally arrest the extortionists and rescue the little girl.

Cast
Anthony O'Sullivan and Robert G. Vignola as the extortionists.

Analysis
The film is composed of eight shots organised in six scenes introduced by intertitles. It uses continuity editing and cross-cutting.

1. Writing the letter. Indoors. Stage set of the bandits' hideout. Medium shot of the two bandits drinking wine sitting at a table, one of them writing a letter. The shot is interrupted by an insert of the letter.

2. The letter received. Indoors, full shot of the stage set of Angelo's shop, with a walk-in fridge to the right. Angelo puts some meat in the fridge, serves a customer and receive a letter. He communicates the content to his wife and daughter, puts on his coat and hat and leaves.

3. The threat carried out. Two outdoors shots.
Long shot of the 7th avenue in New-York with snow on the sides and various pedestrians and horse carriages. One of the gangsters seen in scene 1 walks towards the camera and stops, looking for something on the ground. Maria appears in the distance and walks towards him. He asks her to help looking for something. As she is so busy, a carriage stops, a man alights and helped by the other gangster catches the girl  and take her inside the carriage which leaves hastily. 
Other long shot of 7th avenue. The carriage stops in front of a junk shop. The tow men carry the girl inside. The camera pans slightly left to follow them.

4. The gang's headquarters. Indoors. Full shot of the set seen in scene 1, with the table moved to the right. One of the gangsters is lying on a bed. He gets up and opens the door. A woman enters followed by the two gangsters and Maria. The woman brutally removes Maria's coat and hat and forces her to lie on the bed before leaving. While the three men play cards and drink, Maria tries to escape but she is caught and one of the men threatens to hit her.

5. Levying the blackmail. A clever arrest actually as made by the New York Detectives. Same set as scene 2. Two policemen visit Angelo's shot and check that they can hide in the walk-in fridge. A comic touch is added when they come out of it feeling very cold. When the gangster comes, the butcher's wife opens the door of the walk-in fridge, the two policemen come out and arrest the gangster.

6. Rescue of Maria. Same view as scene 4. Maria is lying on the bed while the two gangsters are playing cards and drinking. A note is passed to Maria through the shutter of the window and she discretely unlocks the shutter and the door. Three policemen crash in and master the gangsters. Maria is reunited with her parents.

References

External links
 

1906 films
American silent short films
American black-and-white films
American crime drama films
Films about Italian-American organized crime
American gangster films
1900s crime drama films
1906 short films
Films directed by Wallace McCutcheon Sr.
1900s American films
Silent American drama films
1900s English-language films